Australian football, also called Australian rules football or Aussie rules, or more simply football or footy, is a contact sport played between two teams of 18 players on an oval field, often a modified cricket ground. Points are scored by kicking the oval ball between the central goal posts (worth six points), or between a central and outer post (worth one point, otherwise known as a "behind").

During general play, players may position themselves anywhere on the field and use any part of their bodies to move the ball. The primary methods are kicking, handballing and running with the ball. There are rules on how the ball can be handled; for example, players running with the ball must intermittently bounce or touch it on the ground. Throwing the ball is not allowed, and players must not get caught holding the ball. A distinctive feature of the game is the mark, where players anywhere on the field who catch the ball from a kick (with specific conditions) are awarded unimpeded possession. Possession of the ball is in dispute at all times except when a free kick or mark is paid. Players can tackle using their hands or use their whole body to obstruct opponents. Dangerous physical contact (such as pushing an opponent in the back), interference when marking, and deliberately slowing the play are discouraged with free kicks, distance penalties, or suspension for a certain number of matches depending on the severity of the infringement. The game features frequent physical contests, spectacular marking, fast movement of both players and the ball, and high scoring.

The sport's origins can be traced to football matches played in Melbourne, Victoria, in 1858, inspired by English public school football games. Seeking to develop a game more suited to adults and Australian conditions, the Melbourne Football Club published the first laws of Australian football in May 1859.

Australian football has the highest spectator attendance and television viewership of all sports in Australia, while the Australian Football League (AFL), the sport's only fully professional competition, is the nation's wealthiest sporting body. The AFL Grand Final, held annually at the Melbourne Cricket Ground, is the highest attended club championship event in the world. The sport is also played at amateur level in many countries and in several variations. Its rules are governed by the AFL Commission with the advice of the AFL's Laws of the Game Committee.

Name 

Australian rules football is known by several nicknames, including Aussie rules, football and footy. In some regions, the Australian Football League markets the game as AFL after itself.

History

Origins 

Primitive forms of football were played sporadically in the Australian colonies in the first half of the 19th century. Compared to cricket and horse racing, football was considered a mere "amusement" by colonists at the time, and while little is known about these early one-off games, evidence does not support a causal link with Australian football. In Melbourne, Victoria, in 1858, in a move that would help to shape Australian football in its formative years, private schools (then termed "public schools" in accordance with English nomenclature) began organising football games inspired by precedents at English public schools. The earliest match, held on 15 June, was between Melbourne Grammar and St Kilda Grammar.

On 10 July 1858, the Melbourne-based Bell's Life in Victoria and Sporting Chronicle published a letter by Tom Wills, captain of the Victoria cricket team, calling for the formation of a "foot-ball club" with a "code of laws" to keep cricketers fit during winter. Born in Australia, Wills played a nascent form of rugby football whilst a pupil at Rugby School in England, and returned to his homeland a star athlete and cricketer. Two weeks later, Wills' friend, cricketer Jerry Bryant, posted an advertisement for a scratch match at the Richmond Paddock adjoining the Melbourne Cricket Ground (MCG). This was the first of several "kickabouts" held that year involving members of the Melbourne Cricket Club, including Wills, Bryant, W. J. Hammersley and J. B. Thompson. Trees were used as goalposts and play typically lasted an entire afternoon. Without an agreed-upon code of laws, some players were guided by rules they had learned in the British Isles, "others by no rules at all". Another milestone in 1858 was a 40-a-side match played under experimental rules between Melbourne Grammar and Scotch College, held at the Richmond Paddock. Umpired by Wills and teacher John Macadam, it began on 7 August and continued over two subsequent Saturdays, ending in a draw with each side kicking one goal. It is commemorated with a statue outside the MCG, and the two schools have since competed annually in the Cordner–Eggleston Cup, the world's oldest continuous football competition.

Since the early 20th century, it has been suggested that Australian football was derived from the Irish sport of Gaelic football. However, there is no archival evidence in favour of a Gaelic influence, and the style of play shared between the two modern codes appeared in Australia long before the Irish game evolved in a similar direction. Another theory, first proposed in 1983, posits that Wills, having grown up amongst Aboriginals in Victoria, may have seen or played the Aboriginal ball game of Marn Grook, and incorporated some of its features into early Australian football. There is only circumstantial evidence that he knew of the game, and according to biographer Greg de Moore's research, Wills was "almost solely influenced by his experience at Rugby School".

First rules

A loosely organised Melbourne side, captained by Wills, played against other football enthusiasts in the winter and spring of 1858. The following year, on 14 May, the Melbourne Football Club was officially established, making it one of the world's oldest football clubs. Three days later, Wills, Hammersley, Thompson and teacher Thomas H. Smith met near the MCG at the Parade Hotel, owned by Bryant, and drafted ten rules: "The Rules of the Melbourne Football Club". These are the laws from which Australian football evolved. The club aimed to create a simple code suited to the hard playing surfaces around Melbourne, and to eliminate the roughest aspects of English school games—such as "hacking" (shin-kicking) in Rugby School football—to lessen the chance of injuries to working men. In another significant departure from English public school football, the Melbourne rules omitted any offside law. "The new code was as much a reaction against the school games as influenced by them", writes Mark Pennings. The rules were distributed throughout the colony; Thompson in particular did much to promote the new code in his capacity as a journalist.

Early competition in Victoria

Following Melbourne's lead, Geelong and Melbourne University also formed football clubs in 1859. While many early Victorian teams participated in one-off matches, most had not yet formed clubs for regular competition. A South Yarra club devised its own rules. To ensure the supremacy of the Melbourne rules, the first-club level competition in Australia, the Caledonian Society's Challenge Cup (1861–64), stipulated that only the Melbourne rules were to be used. This law was reinforced by the Athletic Sports Committee (ASC), which ran a variation of the Challenge Cup in 1865–66. With input from other clubs, the rules underwent several minor revisions, establishing a uniform code known as "Victorian rules". In 1866, the "first distinctively Victorian rule", the running bounce, was formalised at a meeting of club delegates chaired by H. C. A. Harrison, an influential pioneer who took up football in 1859 at the invitation of Wills, his cousin.

The game around this time was defensive and low-scoring, played low to the ground in congested rugby-style scrimmages. The typical match was a 20-per-side affair, played with a ball that was roughly spherical, and lasted until a team scored two goals. The shape of the playing field was not standardised; matches often took place in rough, tree-spotted public parks, most notably the Richmond Paddock (Yarra Park), known colloquially as the Melbourne Football Ground. Wills argued that the turf of cricket fields would benefit from being trampled upon by footballers in winter, and, as early as 1859, football was allowed on the MCG. However, cricket authorities frequently prohibited football on their grounds until the 1870s, when they saw an opportunity to capitalise on the sport's growing popularity. Football gradually adapted to an oval-shaped field, and most grounds in Victoria expanded to accommodate the dual purpose—a situation that continues to this day.

Spread to other colonies

Football became organised in South Australia in 1860 with the formation of the Adelaide Football Club, the oldest football club in Australia outside Victoria. It devised its own rules, and, along with other Adelaide-based clubs, played a variety of codes until 1876, when they uniformly adopted most of the Victorian rules, with South Australian football pioneer Charles Kingston noting their similarity to "the old Adelaide rules". Similarly, Tasmanian clubs quarrelled over different rules until they adopted a slightly modified version of the Victorian game in 1879. The South Australian Football Association (SAFA), the sport's first governing body, formed on 30 April 1877, firmly establishing Victorian rules as the preferred code in that colony. The Victorian Football Association (VFA) formed the following month.

Clubs began touring the colonies in the late 1870s, and in 1879 the first intercolonial match took place in Melbourne between Victoria and South Australia. In order to standardise the sport across Australia, delegates representing the football associations of South Australia, Tasmania, Victoria and Queensland met in 1883 and updated the code. New rules such as holding the ball led to a "golden era" of fast, long-kicking and high-marking football in the 1880s, a time which also saw players such as George Coulthard achieve superstardom, as well as the rise of professionalism, particularly in Victoria and Western Australia, where the code took hold during a series of gold rushes. Likewise when  New Zealand experienced a gold rush, the sport arrived with a rapid influx of Australian miners. Now known as Australian rules or Australasian rules, the sport became the first football code to develop mass spectator appeal, attracting world record attendances for sports viewing and gaining a reputation as "the people's game".

Australian rules football reached Queensland and New South Wales as early as 1866; the sport experienced a period of dominance in the former, and in the latter, several regions remain strongholds of Australian rules, such as the Riverina. However, like in New Zealand, it lost its position as the leading code of both colonies, largely due to the spread of rugby football with British migration, regional rivalries and the lack of strong local governing bodies. In the case of Sydney, denial of access to grounds, the influence of university headmasters from Britain who favoured rugby, and the loss of players to other codes inhibited the game's growth.

Emergence of the VFL
In 1896, delegates from six of the wealthiest VFA clubs—Carlton, Essendon, Fitzroy, Geelong, Melbourne and South Melbourne—met to discuss the formation of a breakaway professional competition. Later joined by Collingwood and St Kilda, the clubs formed the Victorian Football League (VFL), which held its inaugural season in 1897. The VFL's popularity grew rapidly as it made several innovations, such as instituting a finals system, reducing teams from 20 to 18 players, and introducing the behind as a score. Richmond and University joined the VFL in 1908, and by 1925, with the addition of Hawthorn, Footscray and North Melbourne, it had become the preeminent league in the country and would take a leading role in many aspects of the sport.

Interstate football and the World Wars

The time around the federation of the Australian colonies in 1901 saw Australian rules undergo a revival in New South Wales, New Zealand and Queensland. In 1903, both the Queensland Australian Football League and the NSW Australian Football Association were established, and in New Zealand, as it moved towards becoming a dominion, leagues were also established in the major cities. This renewed popularity helped encourage the formation of the Australasian Football Council, which in 1908 in Melbourne staged the first national interstate competition, the Jubilee Australasian Football Carnival, with teams representing each state and New Zealand.

The game was also established early on in the new territories. In the new national capital Canberra both soccer and rugby had a head start, but following the first matches in 1911, Australian rules football in the Australian Capital Territory became a major participation sport. By 1981 it had become much neglected and quickly lagged behind the other football codes. Australian rules football in the Northern Territory began shortly after the outbreak of the war in 1916 with the first match in Darwin. The game went on to become the most popular sport in the Territory and build the highest participation rate for the sport nationally.

Both World War I and World War II had a devastating effect on Australian football and on Australian sport in general. While scratch matches were played by Australian "diggers" in remote locations around the world, the game lost many of its great players to wartime service. Some clubs and competitions never fully recovered. Between 1914 and 1915, a proposed hybrid code of Australian football and rugby league, the predominant code of football in New South Wales and Queensland, was trialled without success. In Queensland, the state league went into recess for the duration of the war. VFL club University left the league and went into recess due to severe casualties. The WAFL lost two clubs and the SANFL was suspended for one year in 1916 due to heavy club losses. The Anzac Day match, the annual game between Essendon and Collingwood on Anzac Day, is one example of how the war continues to be remembered in the football community.

The role of the Australian National Football Council (ANFC) was primarily to govern the game at a national level and to facilitate interstate representative and club competition. In 1968, the ANFC revived the Championship of Australia, a competition first held in 1888 between the premiers of the VFA and SAFA. Although clubs from other states were at times invited, the final was almost always between the premiers from the two strongest state competitions of the time—South Australia and Victoria—with Adelaide hosting most of the matches at the request of the SAFA/SANFL. The last match took place in 1976, with North Adelaide being the last non-Victorian winner in 1972. Between 1976 and 1987, the ANFC, and later the Australian Football Championships (AFC) ran a night series, which invited clubs and representative sides from around the country to participate in a knock-out tournament parallel to the premiership seasons, which Victorian sides still dominated.

With the lack of international competition, state representative matches were regarded with great importance. Due in part to the VFL poaching talent from other states, Victoria dominated interstate matches for three-quarters of a century. State of Origin rules, introduced in 1977, stipulated that rather than representing the state of their adopted club, players would return to play for the state they were first recruited in. This instantly broke Victoria's stranglehold over state titles and Western Australia and South Australia began to win more of their games against Victoria. Both New South Wales and Tasmania scored surprise victories at home against Victoria in 1990.

Towards a national league
The term "Barassi Line", named after VFL star Ron Barassi, was coined by scholar Ian Turner in 1978 to describe the "fictitious geographical barrier" separating the rugby-following parts of New South Wales and Queensland from the rest of the country, where Australian football reigned. It became a reference point for the expansion of Australian football and for establishing a national league.

The way the game was played had changed dramatically due to innovative coaching tactics, with the phasing out of many of the game's kicking styles and the increasing use of handball; while presentation was influenced by television.

In 1982, in a move that heralded big changes within the sport, one of the original VFL clubs, South Melbourne, relocated to Sydney and became known as the Sydney Swans. In the late 1980s, due to the poor financial standing of many of the Victorian clubs, and a similar situation existing in Western Australia in the sport, the VFL pursued a more national competition. Two more non-Victorian clubs, West Coast and Brisbane, joined the league in 1987 generating more than $8 million in license revenue for the Victorian clubs and increasing broadcast revenues which helped the Victorian clubs survive. In their early years, the Sydney and Brisbane clubs struggled both on and off-field because the substantial TV revenues they generated by playing on a Sunday went to the VFL. To protect these revenues the VFL granted significant draft concessions and financial aid to keep the expansion clubs competitive.

The VFL changed its name to the Australian Football League (AFL) for the 1990 season, and over the next decade, three non-Victorian clubs gained entry: Adelaide (1991), Fremantle (1995) and the SANFL's Port Adelaide (1997), the only pre-existing club outside Victoria to join the league. In 2011 and 2012, respectively, two new non-Victorian clubs were added to the competition: Gold Coast and Greater Western Sydney. The AFL, currently with 18 member clubs, is the sport's elite competition and most powerful body. Following the emergence of the AFL, state leagues were quickly relegated to a second-tier status. The VFA merged with the former VFL reserves competition in 1998, adopting the VFL name. State of Origin also declined in importance, especially after an increasing number of player withdrawals. The AFL turned its focus to the annual International Rules Series against Ireland in 1998 before abolishing State of Origin the following year. State and territorial leagues still contest interstate matches, as do AFL Women players.

Although a Tasmanian AFL bid is ongoing, the AFL's focus has been on expanding into markets outside Australian football's traditional heartlands in order to maximise its broadcast revenue. The AFL regularly schedules pre-season exhibition matches in all Australian states and territories as part of the Regional Challenge. The AFL signalled further attempts at expansion in the 2010s by hosting home-and-away matches in New Zealand, followed by China.

Laws of the game

Field

The field, like the ball, is oval-shaped, and in Australia, cricket grounds are often used. No more than 18 players of each team (or, in AFL Women's, 16 players) are permitted to be on the field at any time.

Up to four interchange (reserve) players may be swapped for those on the field at any time during the game. In Australian rules terminology, these players wait for substitution "on the bench"—an area with a row of seats on the sideline. Players must interchange through a designated interchange "gate" with strict penalties for having too many players from one team on the field. In addition, some leagues have each team designate one player as a substitute who can be used to make a single permanent exchange of players during a game.

There is no offside rule nor are there set positions in the rules; unlike many other forms of football, players from both teams may disperse across the whole field before the start of play. However, a typical on-field structure consists of six forwards, six defenders or "backmen" and six midfielders, usually two wingmen, one centre and three followers, including a ruckman, ruck-rover and rover. Only four players from each team are allowed within the centre square at every centre bounce, which occurs at the commencement of each quarter, and to restart the game after a goal is scored. There are also other rules pertaining to allowed player positions during set plays (that is, after a mark or free kick) and during kick-ins following the scoring of a behind.

Match duration
A game consists of four quarters and a timekeeper officiates their duration. At the professional level, each quarter consists of 20 minutes of play, with the clock being stopped for instances such as scores, the ball going out of bounds or at the umpire's discretion, e.g. for serious injury. Lower grades of competition might employ shorter quarters of play. The umpire signals time-off to stop the clock for various reasons, such as the player in possession being tackled into stagnant play. Time resumes when the umpire signals time-on or when the ball is brought into play. Stoppages cause quarters to extend approximately 5–10 minutes beyond the 20 minutes of play. 6 minutes of rest is allowed before the second and fourth quarters, and 20 minutes of rest is allowed at half-time.

The official game clock is available only to the timekeeper(s), and is not displayed to the players, umpires or spectators. The only public knowledge of game time is when the timekeeper sounds a siren at the start and end of each quarter. Coaching staff may monitor the game time themselves and convey information to players via on-field trainers or substitute players. Broadcasters usually display an approximation of the official game time for television audiences, although some will now show the exact time remaining in a quarter.

General play

Games are officiated by umpires. Before the game, the winner of a coin toss determines which directions the teams will play to begin. Australian football begins after the first siren, when the umpire bounces the ball on the ground (or throws it into the air if the condition of the ground is poor), and the two ruckmen (typically the tallest players from each team) battle for the ball in the air on its way back down. This is known as the ball-up. Certain disputes during play may also be settled with a ball-up from the point of contention. If the ball is kicked or hit from a ball-up or boundary throw-in over the boundary line or into a behind post without the ball bouncing, a free kick is paid for out of bounds on the full. A free kick is also paid if the ball is deemed by the umpire to have been deliberately carried or directed out of bounds. If the ball travels out of bounds in any other circumstances (for example, contested play results in the ball being knocked out of bounds) a boundary umpire will stand with his back to the infield and return the ball into play with a throw-in, a high backwards toss back into the field of play.

The ball can be propelled in any direction by way of a foot, clenched fist (called a handball or handpass) or open-hand tap but it cannot be thrown under any circumstances. Once a player takes possession of the ball he must dispose of it by either kicking or handballing it. Any other method of disposal is illegal and will result in a free kick to the opposing team. This is usually called "incorrect disposal", "dropping the ball" or "throwing". If the ball is not in the possession of one player it can be moved on with any part of the body.

A player may run with the ball, but it must be bounced or touched on the ground at least once every . Opposition players may bump or tackle the player to obtain the ball and, when tackled, the player must dispose of the ball cleanly or risk being penalised for holding the ball unless the umpire rules no prior opportunity for disposal. The ball carrier may only be tackled between the shoulders and knees. If the opposition player forcefully contacts a player in the back while performing a tackle, the opposition player will be penalised for a push in the back. If the opposition tackles the player with possession below the knees (a low tackle or a trip) or above the shoulders (a high tackle), the team with possession of the football gets a free kick.

Alternatively, he may choose to "play on" forfeiting the set shot in the hope of pressing an advantage for his team (rather than allowing the opposition to reposition while he prepares for the free kick). Once a player has chosen to play on, normal play resumes and the player who took the mark is again able to be tackled.

There are different styles of kicking depending on how the ball is held in the hand. The most common style of kicking seen in today's game, principally because of its superior accuracy, is the drop punt, where the ball is dropped from the hands down, almost to the ground, to be kicked so that the ball rotates in a reverse end over end motion as it travels through the air. Other commonly used kicks are the torpedo punt (also known as the spiral, barrel, or screw punt), where the ball is held flatter at an angle across the body, which makes the ball spin around its long axis in the air, resulting in extra distance (similar to the traditional motion of an American football punt), and the checkside punt or "banana", kicked across the ball with the outside of the foot used to curve the ball (towards the right if kicked off the right foot) towards targets that are on an angle. There is also the "snap", which is almost the same as a checkside punt except that it is kicked off the inside of the foot and curves in the opposite direction. It is also possible to kick the ball so that it bounces along the ground. This is known as a "grubber". Grubbers can bounce in a straight line, or curve to the left or right.

Apart from free kicks, marks or when the ball is in the possession of an umpire for a ball up or throw in, the ball is always in dispute and any player from either side can take possession of the ball.

Scoring

A goal, worth 6 points, is scored when the football is propelled through the goal posts at any height (including above the height of the posts) by way of a kick from the attacking team. It may fly through "on the full" (without touching the ground) or bounce through, but must not have been touched, on the way, by any player from either team or a goalpost. A goal cannot be scored from the foot of an opposition (defending) player.

A behind, worth 1 point, is scored when the ball passes between a goal post and a behind post at any height, or if the ball hits a goal post, or if any player sends the ball between the goal posts by touching it with any part of the body other than a foot. A behind is also awarded to the attacking team if the ball touches any part of an opposition player, including a foot, before passing between the goal posts. When an opposition player deliberately scores a behind for the attacking team (generally as a last resort to ensure that a goal is not scored) this is termed a rushed behind. As of the 2009 AFL season, a free kick is awarded against any player who deliberately rushes a behind.

The goal umpire signals a goal with two hands pointed forward at elbow height, or a behind with one hand. Both goal umpires then wave flags above their heads to communicate this information to the scorers. The team that has scored the most points at the end of play wins the game. If the scores are level on points at the end of play, then the game is a draw; extra time applies only during finals matches in some competitions.

Sydney's score of 17 goals and 5 behinds equates to 107 points. Geelong's score of 10 goals and 17 behinds equates to a 77-point tally. Sydney  wins the match by a margin of 30 points. Such a result would be written as:

" 17.5 (107) defeated  10.17 (77).

And spoken as:

"Sydney, seventeen-five, one hundred and seven, defeated Geelong  ten-seventeen, seventy-seven".

Additionally, it can be said that:

"Sydney defeated Geelong by 30 points".

The home team is typically listed first and the visiting side is listed second. The scoreline is written with respect to the home side.

For example,  won in successive weeks, once as the home side and once as the visiting side. These would be written out thus:

" 23.20 (158) defeated  8.14 (62)."

" 17.13 (115) defeated by  18.10 (118)."

A draw would be written as:

" 10.8 (68) drew with  10.8 (68)".

Structure and competitions
The football season proper is from March to August (early autumn to late winter in Australia) with finals being held in September and October. In the tropics, the game is sometimes played in the wet season (October to March).

The AFL is recognised by the Australian Sports Commission as being the National Sporting Organisation for Australian Football. There are also seven state/territory-based organisations in Australia, all of which are affiliated with the AFL. These state leagues hold annual semi-professional club competitions, with some also overseeing more than one league. Local semi-professional or amateur organisations and competitions are often affiliated to their state organisations.

The AFL is the de facto world governing body for Australian football. There are also a number of affiliated organisations governing amateur clubs and competitions around the world.

For almost all Australian football club competitions, the aim is to win the Premiership. The premiership is typically decided by a finals series. The teams that occupy the highest positions on the ladder after the home-and-away season play off in a "semi-knockout" finals series, culminating in a single Grand Final match to determine the premiers. Between four and eight teams contest a finals series, typically using the AFL final eight system or a variation of the McIntyre system. The team which finishes first on the ladder after the home-and-away season is referred to as a "minor premier", but this usually holds little stand-alone significance, other than receiving a better draw in the finals.

Many metropolitan leagues have several tiered divisions, with promotion of the lower division premiers and relegation of the upper division's last placed team at the end of each year. At present, none of the top level national or state level leagues in Australia utilise this structure.

Women and Australian football

The high level of interest shown by women in Australian football is considered unique among the world's football codes. It was the case in the 19th century, as it is in modern times, that women made up approximately half of total attendances at Australian football matches—a far greater proportion than, for example, the estimated 10 per cent of women that comprise British soccer crowds. This has been attributed in part to the egalitarian character of Australian football's early years in public parks where women could mingle freely and support the game in various ways.

In terms of participation, there are occasional 19th-century references to women playing the sport, but it was not until the 1910s that the first organised women's teams and competitions appeared. Women's state leagues emerged in the 1980s, and in 2013, the AFL announced plans to establish a nationally televised women's competition. Amidst a surge in viewing interest and participation in women's football, the AFL pushed the founding date of the competition, named AFL Women's, to 2017. Eight AFL clubs won licences to field sides in its inaugural season. By the seventh season, which began in August 2022, all 18 clubs fielded a women's side.

Variations and related sports

Many related games have emerged from Australian football, mainly with variations of contact to encourage greater participation. These include Auskick (played by children aged between 5 and 12), kick-to-kick (and its variants end-to-end footy and marks up), rec footy, 9-a-side footy, masters Australian football, handball and longest-kick competitions. Players outside Australia sometimes engage in related games adapted to available fields, like metro footy (played on gridiron fields) and Samoa rules (played on rugby fields). One such prominent example in use since 2018 is AFLX, a shortened variation of the game with seven players a side, played on a soccer-sized pitch.

International rules football

 
The similarities between Australian football and the Irish sport of Gaelic football have allowed for the creation of a hybrid code known as international rules football. The first international rules matches were contested in Ireland during the 1967 Australian Football World Tour. Since then, various sets of compromise rules have been trialed, and in 1984 the International Rules Series commenced with national representative sides selected by Australia's state leagues (later by the AFL) and the Gaelic Athletic Association (GAA). The competition became an annual event in 1998, but was postponed indefinitely in 2007 when the GAA pulled out due to Australia's severe and aggressive style of play. It resumed in Australia in 2008 under new rules to protect the player with the ball.

Global reach

Australian rules football was played outside Australasia as early as 1888 when Australians studying at Edinburgh University and London University formed teams and competed in London. By the early 20th century, the game had spread with the Australian diaspora to South Africa, the United States and other parts of the Anglosphere; however this growth went into rapid decline following World War I. After World War II, the sport experienced growth in the Pacific region, particularly in Papua New Guinea and Nauru, where Australian football is now the national sport.

Today, the sport is played at an amateur level in various countries throughout the world.23 countries have participated in the International Cup and 9 countries have participated in the AFL Europe Championship with both competitions prohibiting Australian players. Over 20 countries have either affiliation or working agreements with the AFL. There have been many VFL/AFL players who were born outside Australia, an increasing number of which have been recruited through initiatives and, more recently, international scholarship programs. Many of these players have been Irish, as interest in recruiting talented Gaelic footballers dates back to the start of the Irish experiment in the 1960s. Irishmen in the AFL have since become not just starters for their clubs but also Brownlow Medalists (Jim Stynes) and premiership players (Tadhg Kennelly).

Most of the current amateur clubs and leagues in existence have developed since the 1980s, when leagues began to be established in North America, Europe and Asia. The sport developed a cult following in the United States when matches were broadcast on the fledgling ESPN network in the 1980s. As the size of the Australian diaspora has increased, so has the number of clubs outside Australia. This expansion has been further aided by multiculturalism and assisted by exhibition matches as well as exposure generated through players who have converted to and from other football codes. In Papua New Guinea, New Zealand, South Africa, Canada, and the United States there are many thousands of players.

A fan of the sport since attending school in Geelong, King Charles is the Patron of AFL Europe. In 2013, participation across AFL Europe's 21 member nations was more than 5,000 players, the majority of which are European nationals rather than Australian expats. The sport also has a growing presence in India.

The AFL became the de facto governing body when it pushed for the closure of the International Australian Football Council in 2002. The International Cup, held triennially since 2002, is the highest level of international competition.

Although Australian rules football has not yet been a full sport at the Olympic Games or Commonwealth Games, when Melbourne hosted the 1956 Summer Olympics, which included the MCG being the main stadium, Australian rules football was chosen as the native sport to be demonstrated as per International Olympic Committee rules. On 7 December, the sport was demonstrated as an exhibition match at the MCG between a team of VFL and VFA amateurs and a team of VAFA amateurs (professionals were excluded due to the Olympics' strict amateurism policy at the time). The Duke of Edinburgh was among the spectators for the match, which the VAFA won by 12.9 (81) to 8.7 (55). In addition, when Brisbane hosted the 1982 Commonwealth Games, the sport was also demonstrated at the Gabba with a rematch on 6 October of that year's VFL Grand Final with Richmond winning by 28.16 (184) to Carlton's 26.10 (166).

Cultural impact and popularity

Australian football is a sport rich in tradition and Australian cultural references, especially surrounding the rituals of gameday for players, officials and supporters.

Australian football has attracted more overall interest among Australians than any other football code, and, when compared with all sports throughout the nation, has consistently ranked first in the winter reports, and third behind cricket and swimming in summer. Over 1,057,572 fans were paying members of AFL clubs in 2019.  The 2021 AFL Grand Final was the year's most-watched television broadcast in Australia, with an in-home audience of up to 4.11 million.

In 2019, there were 1,716,276 registered participants in Australia including 586,422 females (34 per cent of the overall total) and more than 177,000 registered outside Australia including 79,000 females (45 per cent of the overall total).

In the arts and popular culture

Australian football has inspired many literary works, from poems by C. J. Dennis and Peter Goldsworthy, to the fiction of Frank Hardy and Kerry Greenwood. Historians Manning Clarke and Geoffrey Blainey have also written extensively on the sport. Slang within Australian football has impacted Australian English more broadly, with a number of expressions taking on new meanings in non-sporting contexts, e.g., to "get a guernsey" is to gain recognition or approval, while "shirt-fronting" someone is to accost them.

In 1889, Australian impressionist painter Arthur Streeton captured football games en plein air for the 9 by 5 Impression Exhibition, titling one work The National Game. Paintings by Sidney Nolan (Footballer, 1946) and John Brack (Three of the Players, 1953) helped to establish Australian football as a serious subject for modernists, and many Aboriginal artists have explored the game, often fusing it with the mythology of their region. In cartooning, WEG's VFL/AFL premiership posters—inaugurated in 1954—have achieved iconic status among Australian football fans. Australian football statues can be found throughout the country, some based on famous photographs, among them Haydn Bunton Sr.'s leap, Jack Dyer's charge and Nicky Winmar lifting his jumper. In the 1980s, a group of postmodern architects based in Melbourne began incorporating references to Australian football into their buildings, an example being Building 8 by Edmond and Corrigan.

Dance sequences based on Australian football feature heavily in Robert Helpmann's 1964 ballet The Display, his first and most famous work for the Australian Ballet. The game has also inspired well-known plays such as And the Big Men Fly (1963) by Alan Hopgood and David Williamson's The Club (1977), which was adapted into a 1980 film, directed by Bruce Beresford. Mike Brady's 1979 hit "Up There Cazaly" is considered an Australian football anthem, and references to the sport can be found in works by popular musicians, from singer-songwriter Paul Kelly to the alternative rock band TISM. Many Australian football video games have been released, most notably the AFL series.

Australian Football Hall of Fame

For the centenary of the VFL/AFL in 1996, the Australian Football Hall of Fame was established. That year, 136 significant figures across the various competitions were inducted into the Hall of Fame. An additional 115 inductees have been added since the creation of the Hall of Fame, resulting in a total number of 251 inductees.

In addition to the Hall of Fame, select members are chosen to receive the elite Legend status. Due to restrictions limiting the number of Legend status players to 10% of the total number of Hall of Fame inductees, there are currently 25 players with the status in the Hall of Fame.

See also 

 Australian rules football attendance records
 Australian rules football positions
 List of Australian rules football clubs
 List of Australian rules football rivalries
 List of Australian rules football terms

References

Citations

Sources

Books

Journal and conference articles

External links

 Australian Football League (AFL) official website
 Australian Football: Celebrating The History of the Great Australian Game
 2020 Laws of Australian Football
 Australian Football explained in 31 languages – a publication from AFL.com.au
 Reading Australian Rules Football - The Definitive Guide to the Game
 State Library of Victoria Research Guide to Australian Football

Australian rules football
1858 introductions
1859 establishments in Australia
Ball games
Football codes
Sports originating in Australia
Team sports
Turf sports